The 4.7 cm KPÚV vz. 38 is an anti-tank gun produced by the Škoda Works that saw service in World War II.  Originally designed for the Czechoslovak Army, some were also sold to Yugoslavia. A number were appropriated by the Germans after the German occupation of Czechoslovakia in 1939 and used under the names 4.7 cm PaK (t) or PaK 38(t). The Germans continued production and mounted the PaK 38(t) on the Panzerkampfwagen I chassis as the Panzerjäger I tank destroyer. A similar attempt to mount it on the chassis of captured Renault R-35 tanks was less successful.

The barrel has the unique feature of being able to swing 180° so that it lays flat over the trails for transport and the outer part of the trails can also be folded inward to reduce its size.  The gun has a small gun shield and wooden-spoked wheels.  Despite its dated appearance it was superior to most contemporary designs and the gun is armed with both AP rounds and HE rounds for infantry support.

Performance

See also 
 Weapons of Czechoslovakia interwar period

Notes

References
 Gander, T.J. German Anti-tank Guns 1939-1945, Almark Publications, 1973.   (soft cover)
 Gander, Terry and Chamberlain, Peter. Weapons of the Third Reich: An Encyclopedic Survey of All Small Arms, Artillery and Special Weapons of the German Land Forces 1939-1945. New York: Doubleday, 1979 
 Hogg, Ian.Twentieth-Century Artillery, Barnes & Noble Books, 2000.  
 Janoušek, Jiří. Československé dělostřelectvo 1918-1939, Corona, 2007. 
 Jentz, Thomas L. Panzerjaeger (3.7 cm Tak to Pz.Sfl.Ic): Development and Employment from 1927 to 1941 (Panzer Tracts No. 7-1) Boyds, MD: Panzer Tracts, 2004.  

World War II anti-tank guns of Germany
47 mm artillery
Artillery of Czechoslovakia
Military equipment introduced in the 1930s